Charles Franklin Brookhart Jr.  (born August 30, 1948) served as the ninth bishop of the Episcopal Diocese of Montana. He retired as Bishop of Montana on November 1, 2018, and currently lives in Los Angeles and continues to preach, teach, and write. He is a resident bishop on the staff of St. James' Episcopal Church (Los Angeles, California).

Biography 
Brookhart was born in Parkersburg, West Virginia. He received a Master of Divinity degree from United Lutheran Seminary, Philadelphia. His Doctor of Ministry in homiletics was conferred by United Theological Seminary in 1984.  He has served as an adjunct instructor at United Theological Seminary, Dayton, OH, and at Wheeling Jesuit University, where he taught scripture at both undergraduate and graduate levels.

He served four churches in Ohio and West Virginia, as a member and president of the Standing Committee, chair of the evangelism committee, and chair of the Search Committee for the seventh Bishop of West Virginia. Prior to his episcopal election in 2003, he served as rector of Lawrencefield Parish Church in Wheeling, West Virginia. He was consecrated on September 27, 2003, in St Helena's Cathedra, Helena, Montana.  While serving as Bishop of Montana, he also was appointed co-chair of the Episcopal-United Methodist Dialog and was a member of the international Anglican-Methodist Dialog.

As bishop, his significant developments include: a capital fund drive to benefit the diocesan church camp; initiation of Native American ministry; reorganization of finances and structure; revitalization of the diaconate; and a marked increase in giving.

Brookhart is the author of four books: Living the Resurrection: Reflections after Easter; Journey with Jesus: Encountering Christ in his Birth, Baptism, Death and Resurrection; Language of Love: A Basic Christian Vocabulary; and Washed and Well-Fed: How the Sacraments Change Everything.

He is married to Dr. Susan Brookhart, an educational consultant. They have two adult daughters.

See also
 List of Episcopal bishops of the United States
 Historical list of the Episcopal bishops of the United States

References 

1948 births
Living people
People from Helena, Montana
Place of birth missing (living people)
Episcopal bishops of Montana